Gastón Claudio Giménez (born 27 July 1991) is a professional footballer who plays as a midfielder for Major League Soccer club Chicago Fire. Born in Argentina, he represents the Paraguay national team.

Club career
Giménez's career started in 2011 with Almirante Brown. His debut arrived at the beginning of the 2011–12 Primera B Nacional season, when he played the final fifteen minutes in a goalless draw away to Rosario Central on 1 October 2011. In February 2012, Giménez scored the first goal of his career in a 2–0 win over Defensa y Justicia. After one goal in nineteen games in his first season, Giménez went onto make another sixty-nine appearances and score three more goals for the club across the next two seasons. In June 2014, Giménez signed for fellow Primera B Nacional team Atlético Tucumán. One goal in fifteen matches followed.

On 2 February 2015, Giménez joined Argentine Primera División side Godoy Cruz. Months later, on 30 May 2015, he was sent off in just his second start for the club versus Unión Santa Fe; the second time in his career that he had received a red card in a match against Unión Santa Fe, the first occurred in March 2014 whilst with Almirante Brown. Giménez remained with Godoy Cruz for a total of four seasons, prior to departing in January 2018 to join Estudiantes of the Primera División. Vélez Sarsfield purchased Giménez in the following July.

On 24 February 2020, Giménez signed with Major League Soccer side Chicago Fire on a two-year deal. He made eighteen appearances in his first season there.

International career
Giménez was born in Argentina and is of Paraguayan descent. In November 2018, Giménez was called up to the Argentina national team by Lionel Scaloni for friendlies with Mexico. He made his international debut in the first friendly with Mexico on 16 November, being substituted on for Giovani Lo Celso with two minutes remaining. He was selected on Scaloni's preliminary squad for the 2019 Copa América. On 20 July 2020, Giménez confirmed claims by Paraguay national team coach Eduardo Berizzo and announced that he had finalized naturalization proceedings, making him eligible to play for Paraguay. On 28 September 2020, he was called up for the 2022 FIFA World Cup qualification matches against Peru and Venezuela by Paraguay national team coach Eduardo Berizzo. He made his competitive debut with Paraguay on 8 October as a starter of the match against Peru, making him cap-tied to Paraguay. He scored on his second cap away to Venezuela.

Career statistics

Club

International
.

Scores and results list Paraguay's goal tally first, score column indicates score after each Giménez goal.

See also
 List of association footballers who have been capped for two senior national teams

References

External links

1991 births
Living people
People from Formosa, Argentina
Citizens of Paraguay through descent
Paraguayan footballers
Paraguay international footballers
Argentine footballers
Argentina international footballers
Argentine sportspeople of Paraguayan descent
Association football midfielders
Primera Nacional players
Argentine Primera División players
Club Almirante Brown footballers
Major League Soccer players
Atlético Tucumán footballers
Godoy Cruz Antonio Tomba footballers
Estudiantes de La Plata footballers
Club Atlético Vélez Sarsfield footballers
Chicago Fire FC players
Designated Players (MLS)
Dual internationalists (football)